Anastasios Mousidis (born 1934) is a Greek wrestler. He competed in the men's Greco-Roman lightweight at the 1960 Summer Olympics.

References

External links
 

1934 births
Living people
Greek male sport wrestlers
Olympic wrestlers of Greece
Wrestlers at the 1960 Summer Olympics
Sportspeople from Athens
20th-century Greek people